Olympian High School is a public high school located within the Sweetwater Union High School District in San Diego County, California. The school, with a capacity of 2,500 students, opened in August 2006. It is located in the outskirts of the Otay Ranch area of Chula Vista.

History
With the  site for the school being located only a couple miles from the Olympic Training Center, naming the school Olympic High School seemed a logical choice; but the United States Olympic & Paralympic Committee (USOC) denied 
the request to use the name "Olympic." Following further negotiations with the USOC, Sweetwater Union High School District was authorized to use the name Olympic Vista High School. The USOC did eventually approve the use of Olympian High School as the name of the school resulting in a quick name change.

Demographics
The demographic breakdown of the 2,347 students enrolled for the 2020-2021 school year was:

Race and ethnicity 

 Hispanic - 49.08%
 Asian - 24.12%
 White - 10.82%
 Multiracial - 8.18%
 Black - 7.24%
 American Indian/Alaska Native - 0.3%
 Native Hawaiian/Pacific Islander - 0.26%

Gender 

 Male - 50.96%
 Female - 49.04%

In addition, 100% of the students were eligible for free or reduced-price lunch for the 2022-2023 school year.

Academics
Olympian High School offers the following Advanced Placement courses:

AP Art History
AP Biology
AP Calculus AB
AP Calculus BC
AP Chemistry
AP Computer Science A
AP Computer Science Principles
AP English Language
AP English Literature
AP Human Geography
AP Italian
AP Music Theory
AP Physics C: Mechanics
AP Psychology
AP Spanish Language
AP Spanish Literature
AP Statistics
AP Studio Art
AP U.S. Government
AP U.S. History
AP World History: Modern

Athletics
Olympian High School offers the following athletic programs:

Fall
Varsity Football
Varsity Volleyball (Women)
Cross Country (Men/Women)
Tennis (Women)
Water-Polo (Men)
Golf (Women)
Color Guard

Winter
Varsity Basketball (Men/Women)
Varsity Soccer (Men/Women)
Water-Polo (Women)
Wrestling (Men/Women)
Winter Guard

Spring
Varsity Volleyball (Men)
Varsity Baseball
Varsity Softball
Varsity Track & Field (Men/Women)
Tennis (Men)
Swim/Dive
Golf (Men)
Lacrosse (Men/Women)

References

External links
 Olympian High School Website

High schools in San Diego County, California
Public high schools in California
Educational institutions established in 2006
2006 establishments in California
Education in Chula Vista, California